Stephen Beckett Whatley (born 22 July 1965 in London, England) is an English painter. He specialises in expressionistic oil paintings. His subjects include city scapes, landscapes, architecture, still life, portraits and Christian works.

Since 1992, Whatley has been honoring the anniversaries of architectural landmarks in London by painting them in their centenary years. He typically paints them on location. Landmarks he has painted include Bush House - former home of the BBC World Service, Broadcasting House, BBC Television Centre and the Tate Gallery, Tate Britain, Tate Modern, and Tower Bridge.

Since the year 2000, Whatley's Christian faith (he was born Anglican and converted to Roman Catholicism in 2011) has inspired him to paint numerous tributes to Catholic devotions.

In December 2008 TIME magazine editors selected his portrait tribute of Barack Obama from 100,000 images on the photography site Flickr.com for publication. It was published  in TIME magazine's 'Person of The Year' issue 2008/2009. The portrait is now in the private collection of an American property developer living in London.

Education
Whatley studied at the Ipswich School of Art from 1981 to 1983, and the Norwich School of Art from 1983 to 1986, where he qualified with a BA (Hons) in Fine Art – Painting. Whatley then studied at the University of London from 1986 to 1987, qualifying with a PGCE in art and design.

Lecturer
From 1990 to 2000, Whatley was a part-time Lecturer of Portraiture at Kensington & Chelsea College, in London.

Commissions
In 1999, London Transport commissioned Whatley to paint an interior - 'The Grand Staircase' – which he did on location inside Buckingham Palace. This painting was reproduced on posters and displayed all over the London Underground.

Also in 1999, the Royal Collection commissioned him to paint an exterior view of Buckingham Palace, which he did on location from the edge of Green Park. This was reproduced in advertisements promoting the Annual Summer Opening of the State Rooms in 1999 and 2000.

In 2000 Whatley was commissioned by Historic Royal Palaces and the Pool of London Partnership, to undertake a series of 30 paintings for HM Tower of London. Many of the works were painted on location in and around the Tower. Others were inspired by various historical images. In the spring of 2001 the paintings were reproduced on steel vitreous enamel panels lining the walls of the Tower Hill pedestrian underpass, connecting Tower Hill Underground station to the Tower of London.

In 2001, BBC Heritage commissioned Stephen to paint a view of the Radio Theatre inside Broadcasting House and to paint a view of the Top of the Pops Studio, at BBC Television Centre, during rehearsals and recording of the program.

Exhibitions
Whatley has exhibited in numerous exhibitions since 1983 - including shows at the ICA (Institute of Contemporary Art), the Lloyd's Building and London's Olympia Exhibition Arena.  He has had solo exhibitions since 1988 - highlights being his May 1993 exhibition, Hollywood Gold at London's National Theatre & his 2007 exhibition in Cork Street, London. In 2012, his Diamond Jubilee portrait tribute of Queen Elizabeth II  was exhibited at the Olympia International Art & Antiques Fair, London.

Portraits

Whatley has painted the portraits of many public figures. They include actors Dame Judi Dench, Susan Hampshire OBE, Alec McCowen CBE, Sir Ian McKellen, Barbara Windsor MBE, Frances Barber, Prunella Scales CBE,
Julie Walters OBE, Alison Steadman OBE, actor and singer Helen Reddy, and Siân Phillips CBE, TV presenter Sarah Greene; and barrister Michael Mansfield QC.

Media

Whatley's work has been the subject of features in newspapers and magazines including The Guardian (18 February 1991); HELLO! magazine (#217 – 29 August 1992 / #1043 – 21 October 2008 / #1171 – 25 April 2011); Sunday Express, 2 May 1993; Marie Claire, May 1993; USA TODAY (May 1993) METRO newspaper (15 September 1999 and 17 July 2001) The London Times (11 February 2002) The Guardian Weekend Magazine (26 April 2003); New York Times (August 2004) MAJESTY magazine  January 2009 – a major 5 - page feature about Whatley's Royal commissions); and various Catholic publications in 2010–2012.

In 2002, Whatley's painting of Buckingham Palace, in the Royal Collection, was reproduced on the programs for HM Queen's two Golden Jubilee concerts, held in the gardens of Buckingham Palace.

In 2006, one of Whatley's tributes to Marilyn Monroe was published in a new book, Marilyn In Art by Roger G Taylor (Pop Art Books), to coincide with the 80th anniversary of the Hollywood star's birth.

In 2007, Whatley's work promoted London's Tower Music Festival at the Tower Of London. His exhibition 'Hollywood Icons to Royal Gems' also opened at the Arndean Gallery in London's Cork Street; exhibiting two Royal exclusives, one of his paintings, the 'Crown Jewels II', on loan from HM Tower of London & 'Buckingham Palace: View From The East Front', on loan by gracious permission of Her Majesty The Queen.

In 2004, Whatley was invited to the ceremonial re-opening of Tower Hill (which included the Tower Hill underpass). He was presented to the Queen and the Duke of Edinburgh in the Tower of London.

References

1965 births
Living people
20th-century English painters
21st-century English painters
Alumni of Norwich University of the Arts
Alumni of the University of London
Converts to Roman Catholicism from Anglicanism
English male painters
Painters from London
20th-century English male artists
21st-century English male artists